POL was a monthly magazine that was first published by Gareth Powell Publishing in Australia in the late 1960s. It is considered to have played an important role in raising awareness of the status of women, and established new standards in terms of content, design and photography.

In March–May 2003, the Australian National Portrait Gallery in Old Parliament House, Canberra held a retrospective of POL magazine which it called Portrait of a Generation. A catalogue was published for the occasion with an introduction which said:

Gareth Powell has been quoted as saying that the name POL stood for nothing, and was chosen by the magazine's first editor, Richard Walsh, because it was short and lent itself to bad puns in headlines.

A major influence on the style of the magazine was the photographic and design team that had started with Chance International, one of the early men's magazines in Australia. The photographers were among the best that Australia had produced, and they were given the opportunity with both POL and Chance to choose the photographs used and to decide how they should be displayed. No other magazine in Australia at that time allowed that sort of involvement by the creative staff.

The only person who was kept well away from the creative process was the publisher and owner, Gareth Powell. He knew printing - and POL set new standards in that area for Australia - and he knew publishing. But the editorial content of the magazine was, in its earliest and finest days, totally under the control of Richard Walsh and a team which contained many of the great editorial talents of Australia. Guest editors included Germaine Greer (1972) and Richard Neville (1974).

After Richard Walsh's departure, and the sale of Pol Magazine to Sungravure in 1972, Maggie Makeig formerly of Everybody's took over as editor. She edited Pol from early 1972 until her untimely death in July 1976 and was the one who organised Australia's first ever nude male centrefold. The star of this Centrefold long before Cleo was launched was Paul du Feu, the former husband of feminist icon Germaine Greer. A friend of Greer's, Makeig also organised and oversaw Germaine as guest editor for an edition of Pol as well as Richard Neville in 1974. She was also responsible for employing David Leigh as art director and brought award winning writers on board. She was revered as a ground breaker with coverlines during the days of Number 96 which featured actress Pat McDonald as Dorrie Evans in evening gown and the line "Charity is not all Balls. Arnold Earnshaw edited POL for 8 months and from 1977 and 1984 the magazine was edited by Robin Ingram who was responsible for recruiting Don Dunstan to act as guest editor, a role he performed from May 1980 for just under a year. David Leigh, who won several international graphic design awards, was Pol's Art Director for a decade from the mid 70s. POL ceased publication in 1986.

References

External links
 Photographer Wesley Stacy website
 "POL", Re:collection. Retrieved on 15 January 2017.
 Graham Rochford Tucker, From novelist to essayist: the Charmian Clift phenomenon, thesis manuscript, University of Wollongong Thesis Collection, pp. 400–429. Retrieved 15 October 2016.
 Books and Magazines Published by Gareth Powell, publishinghistory.com. Front covers of POL. Retrieved on 23 April 2017.

1968 establishments in Australia
1986 disestablishments in Australia
Monthly magazines published in Australia
Women's magazines published in Australia
Defunct magazines published in Australia
English-language magazines
Magazines established in 1968
Magazines disestablished in 1986
Magazines published in Sydney